

142001–142100 

|-id=014
| 142014 Neirinck ||  || Pierre Neirinck (1926–) , French-British head of the Satellite Orbits Group at Appleton Laboratory in the UK during the 1970s || 
|-id=020
| 142020 Xinghaishiyan ||  || Xinghaishiyan, motto of The Suzhou Industry Park Xinghai Experimental Senior School, meaning "All stars shine brilliantly; All rivers flow to the Sea" and an educational philosophy "to make everyone a star". Xing means "star", hai means "sea", and shiyan means "experimental" || 
|-id=084
| 142084 Jamesdaniel ||  || James Sealy (1951–1978) and Daniel Sealy (born 1957) , sons of Robert and Hazel Sealy, friends of American astronomer James Whitney Young who discovered this minor planet (also see 147397 Bobhazel) || 
|-id=091
| 142091 Omerblaes ||  || Omer Michael Blaes (born 1961), an astrophysicist at the University of California Santa Barbara. || 
|}

142101–142200 

|-id=106
| 142106 Nengshun ||  || Ye Nengshun (1894–1952), a great-grandfather of Chinese astronomer Ye Quan-Zhi, who discovered this minor planet || 
|}

142201–142300 

|-id=275
| 142275 Simonyi ||  || Károly Simonyi (1916–2001), a professor of electrical engineering at the Technical University of Budapest. || 
|-id=291
| 142291 Dompfaff ||  || "Dompfaff" is the common name for a cardinal (priest) in the German catholic liturgy. It is also the name of the endangered Eurasian bullfinch, a beautiful small bird with a red breast. It appears regularly in the Eifel (Ardennes) near the Hoher List Observatory during winter. || 
|}

142301–142400 

|-id=368
| 142368 Majden ||  || Edward Majden (born 1939), Canadian amateur astronomer, recorder of meteor spectra, associate member of the Meteorites and Impacts Advisory Committee, and winner of the 2006 Chant Medal by the Royal Astronomical Society of Canada † || 
|-id=369
| 142369 Johnhodges ||  || John V. Hodges (1918–1983), active member and later observatory director of the Regina Astronomical Society || 
|}

142401–142500 

|-id=408
| 142408 Trebur ||  || The German municipality of Trebur, home of the Michael Adrian Observatory , where this minor planet was discovered || 
|}

142501–142600 

|-id=562
| 142562 Graetz ||  || Paul Graetz (1889–1937), German Army officer, the first person to cross southern Africa by automobile (1907–1909) || 
|}

142601–142700 

|-bgcolor=#f2f2f2
| colspan=4 align=center | 
|}

142701–142800 

|-id=752
| 142752 Boroski ||  || William Boroski (born 1960), American astronomer and contributor to the Sloan Digital Sky Survey || 
|-id=753
| 142753 Briegel ||  || Charlie Briegel (born 1949), American computer scientist with the Sloan Digital Sky Survey || 
|-id=754
| 142754 Brunner ||  || Robert Brunner (born 1968), American astrophysicist with the Sloan Digital Sky Survey || 
|-id=755
| 142755 Castander ||  || Francisco J. Castander (born 1968), Spanish astronomer with the Sloan Digital Sky Survey || 
|-id=756
| 142756 Chiu ||  || Kuenley Chiu (born 1975), American astronomer with the Sloan Digital Sky Survey || 
|-id=757
| 142757 Collinge ||  || Matthew Collinge (born 1979), American astronomer with the Sloan Digital Sky Survey || 
|-id=758
| 142758 Connolly ||  || Andy Connolly (born 1966), American astronomer with the Sloan Digital Sky Survey || 
|-id=759
| 142759 Covey ||  || Kevin Covey (born 1977), American astronomer at Lowell Observatory and contributor to the Sloan Digital Sky Survey || 
|-id=760
| 142760 Csabai ||  || Istvan Csabai (born 1965), Hungarian physicist with the Sloan Digital Sky Survey || 
|}

142801–142900 

|-id=822
| 142822 Czarapata ||  || Paul Czarapata (born 1947), American astronomer with the Sloan Digital Sky Survey || 
|}

142901–143000 

|-bgcolor=#f2f2f2
| colspan=4 align=center | 
|}

References 

142001-143000